Beau Marie St. Clair ( – January 9, 2016) was an American film producer. In 1996, St. Clair, together with her friend and producing partner, actor Pierce Brosnan, established Irish DreamTime, a production company whose credits include The Thomas Crown Affair (1999), Evelyn (2002), Laws of Attraction (2004), The Matador (2005), The November Man (2014), and I.T. (2016).

St. Clair, a California native, also worked as a production supervisor for several Broadway shows, including The Threepenny Opera in 1989 and Shōgun: The Musical in 1990. During the 1980s and 1990s, she worked as an assistant to film producer Jerome Hellman, including work on The Mosquito Coast in 1986. Her other assistant producing credits included Hideaway in 1995, Race the Sun in 1996, and The Edge in 1997.

St. Clair and Brosnan were longtime friends by the mid-1990s. Brosnan had starred as James Bond in 1995's GoldenEye, the seventeenth film in the Bond series. Goldeneye, a commercial success, was a boost to Brosnan's career. He and St. Clair decided to begin producing films. In a 2014 interview, Brosnan recalled, "When GoldenEye … had the success that it had, we said, 'Let's make movies. Let's step forth and create our own projects.' It's as simple as that, really." Together, Beau St. Clair and Pierce established the Irish DreamTime production company in 1996, with additional backing from Metro-Goldwyn-Mayer (MGM).

Under St. Clair and Brosnan, Irish DreamTime produced and released ten films between 1998 and 2016. Their first production was The Nephew, a drama released in 1998. They then credited the 1999 remake, The Thomas Crown Affair, which starred Brosnan and Rene Russo. Other Irish DreamTime films have included Evelyn in 2002, Laws of Attraction in 2004, The Matador in 2005, and The November Man in 2014. St. Clair also produced Irish DreamTime's I.T., a 'tech' thriller released in 2016. She also produced the 2002 remake, Rollerball.

Beau St. Clair died following a lengthy illness with ovarian cancer at her home in Malibu, California, on January 9, 2016, at the age of 63. She was survived by her mother and two brothers. Her husband, the late Academy Award-winning film producer Lloyd Phillips, died from a heart attack in January 2013.

Brosnan, whose first wife, Cassandra Harris, and her daughter, Charlotte, also both died of ovarian cancer, released a statement following her death, "My dearest friend Beau Marie St Claire passed away on Saturday, Jan 9th from Ovarian Cancer. She fought this insidious disease valiantly for ten long years. Beau was the sister I never had, my dearest friend for 30 years, and my producing partner at Irish Dreamtime, a company we formed twenty years ago. In that time we produced 10 films including The Thomas Crown Affair, The Matador, Evelyn, The November Man, and this past summer a thriller called IT. Beau Marie was a beautiful woman in every way. She had style, grace, humor, intellect, and a kind heart that I will forever miss."

Filmography
She was a producer in all films unless otherwise noted.

Film

Miscellaneous crew

Thanks

References

External links

1950s births
2016 deaths
American film producers
People from Malibu, California
Date of birth uncertain
Film producers from California
Deaths from ovarian cancer
Deaths from cancer in California